Michael Olbrich (September 29, 1881 – October 10, 1929) was a Madison, Wisconsin, lawyer, politician, and conservationist, who founded Olbrich Botanical Gardens and the University of Wisconsin-Madison Arboretum.

Biography
Olbrich was born Michael Balthasar Olbrich in Chemung, Illinois in 1881. He graduated from the University of Wisconsin-Madison in 1902, where he was a member of the debate team.

A noted enthusiast of nature, Olbrich founded what is now known as Olbrich Botanical Gardens in Madison, Wisconsin. The Olbrich Gateway at the University of Wisconsin-Madison Arboretum is also named for him.

Olbrich was involved in a court case over a Montana sheep ranch in which he had invested much of his money, which led to his suicide in 1929.

Career
Olbrich was chairman of the Republican Party of Wisconsin in 1912. Later, he served as deputy attorney general of Wisconsin from 1919 to 1921. He was a member of the law firm of Olbrich and Siebecker.

References

People from McHenry County, Illinois
Republican Party of Wisconsin chairs
Wisconsin lawyers
University of Wisconsin–Madison alumni
1881 births
1929 suicides
American politicians who committed suicide
Suicides by hanging in Wisconsin
Politicians from Madison, Wisconsin
Lawyers from Madison, Wisconsin
19th-century American lawyers
20th-century American lawyers